Anna Maria may refer to:

People
 Anna Maria (given name), including a list of people and characters with the name

Places
 Anna Maria, Florida
 Anna Maria Island,  Florida

Institutions
 Anna Maria College, in Paxton, Massachusetts

See also
 Annamaria
 Anamaria
 Maria Anna (disambiguation)